The finals and the qualifying heats of the women's 200 metre butterfly event at the 1998 World Aquatics Championships were held on Sunday 18 January 1998 in Perth, Western Australia.

A Final

B Final

Qualifying heats

See also
1996 Women's Olympic Games 200m Butterfly (Atlanta)
1997 Women's World SC Championships 200m Butterfly (Gothenburg)
1997 Women's European LC Championships 200m Butterfly (Seville)
2000 Women's Olympic Games 200m Butterfly (Sydney)

References

Swimming at the 1998 World Aquatics Championships
1998 in women's swimming